The Logan Utah Temple (formerly the Logan Temple) was completed in 1884, and is the fourth temple built by the Church of Jesus Christ of Latter-day Saints. Located in the city of Logan, Utah, it was the second temple built in the Rocky Mountains, after the St. George Temple, which remains the only Latter-day Saint temple that has been in operation longer than the Logan Temple.

The temple in Logan was announced on October 6, 1876, with its groundbreaking taking place on May 18, 1877.  The groundbreaking was shortly after dedication of the St. George Temple on April 6, 1877.  The site of the Logan Temple had been held in reserve for many years. It was used as a park and public grounds before being dedicated as the site for the temple. The Salt Lake Temple had been announced in 1847, but construction was still underway and would not be completed until 1893, so the Logan and St. George temples were built to satisfy the church's need for temples.

More than 25,000 people worked on the Logan Temple. Timber for the building was hauled from the Temple Fork area of Logan Canyon. Lime and quartzite was quarried out of nearby Green Canyon. Most materials were extracted during winter when farm duties were low and because transporting material was easier on sled than wagon. A combination of hired hands and volunteers were used with wards providing quotas of volunteers. As completion of the temple neared, women in the area were asked to make carpets for the temple as funds did not allow them to purchase store made carpet for the entire building. The women spent two months working to hand make 2,144 square yards of carpet.

The Logan Temple was the second temple to be completed in the Utah area and is the church's sixth largest. The design by the church's head architect, Truman O. Angell, had two towers and was based on the same pattern as the Salt Lake Temple, with a large assembly hall and other similar rooms. On May 17, 1884, the Logan Temple was dedicated by church president John Taylor. The design incorporates an unusual amount of Gothic detailing compared with other temples, which are more Renaissance or Byzantine-inspired.

In 1917, a fire started in a closet under the grand staircase in the central north part of the main building. It completely destroyed this oval staircase which connected the first through the third floors. It caused about $40,000 in damage and took about three months to repair.  In 1949, the temple was remodeled and received updated lighting, heating, air conditioning, elevators, and other modern conveniences. In 1977, more remodeling was undertaken and the interior was completely gutted and redone. After remodeling, the temple was rededicated on March 13, 1979, by church president Spencer W. Kimball.

The Logan Temple was placed on the National Register of Historic Places on November 20, 1975.

Temple presidents
Notable temple presidents have included: Marriner W. Merrill (1884–1906); William Budge (1906–18); ElRay L. Christiansen (1943–52); and W. Rolfe Kerr (2008–11). Thomas M. Cherrington has been the current temple president since October 2020.

See also

 The Church of Jesus Christ of Latter-day Saints in Utah
 Comparison of temples of The Church of Jesus Christ of Latter-day Saints
 List of temples of The Church of Jesus Christ of Latter-day Saints
 List of temples of The Church of Jesus Christ of Latter-day Saints by geographic region
 Temple architecture (Latter-day Saints)
 Logan Temple Barn

References

External links
 
Logan Utah Temple Official site
Logan Utah Temple at ChurchofJesusChristTemples.org

19th-century Latter Day Saint temples
Buildings and structures in Logan, Utah
Churches on the National Register of Historic Places in Utah
Churches completed in 1884
Temples (LDS Church) in Utah
1884 establishments in Utah Territory
National Register of Historic Places in Cache County, Utah
1884 in Christianity